Only When I Breathe is the third studio album by Swedish singer Peter Jöback. It was released on 20 September 2000. The album peaked at number one on the Swedish Albums Chart.

Track listing
"Only When I Breathe" - 3:51
"Higher" - 3:44
"Because" - 4:21
"I" - 4:23
"Under My Skin" - 3:46
"The Man I Wanna Be" - 4:25
"Tonight" - 3:47
"Seeing Red" - 3:59
"Rain" - 4:11
"Sun" - 3:19
"Searching for Love" - 4:22

Personnel
Peter Jöback – vocals, organ
Lasse Andersson – guitar, keyboards
Tore Johansson - guitar, bass
Rasmus Kihlberg - drums

Charts

References

2000 albums
Peter Jöback albums